Dujana is a village, formerly a princely state, in Beri tehsil of Jhajjar district of Haryana State, India. The village is administered by a Sarpanch, an elected representative of the village.

History
 
Duna Princely State existed since the time of Mughals. During the first war of independence in 1857, Nawab Hasan Ali of Dujana played a key role.

Before it became a Princely State it was under the Nawab of Jhajjar. A war between the Army of Nawab and residents of Dujana & few other nearby villages took place. Locals confirm the war and reason was that the Nawab was willing to marry a Dujana girl but family and village denied for this.  So, when the Nawab attacked the village an with army of 40,000 troops, all residents of Dujana and few nearby villages fought the war against the Nawab. Every male who was able to fight took part in thr war and they defeated (literally by butchering) the Nawab's army and the Nawab was severely injured in this fight. However, their army saved him. In this war 60 to 70% of residents of Dujana & few nearby villages also lost their life, but they saved their honour, and after this a Princely State named with Dujana created. This was the smallest princely state.

Demography 
, the village has a total number of 1547 houses and the population of 7715 of which include 4070 are males while 3645 are females.

Religion

Notes

References

Cities and towns in Jhajjar district